Verdant Lake is a  lake that is located in south-western Schoolcraft County, Michigan in the Hiawatha National Forest.  It is just east of the county line with Alger and just north of the county line with Delta County.  Other nearby lakes include Hugaboom Lake, Mowe Lake, Blue Lake, Corner-Straits Chain of lakes, Nineteen Lake, Ironjaw Lake, and Round Lake.

See also
List of lakes in Michigan

References 

Lakes of Schoolcraft County, Michigan
Lakes of Michigan